Ritu Beri is an Indian fashion designer.

She became head of the Ready to Wear section of French fashion brand, Jean-Louis Scherrer, in March 2002.

She launched a not-for-profit organisation, The Luxury League to promote creativity and innovation in the luxury industry of India. She was appointed an advisor to the Khadi and Village Industries Commission (KVIC), a part of the Ministry of Micro, Small and Medium Enterprises, Government of India. She is also an advisor to Rishihood University.

Personal life

She was born in Delhi.

In 2004 she married exporter Bobby Chadha.

Her father Balbir Singh Beri is an ex-army officer.

Her mother Indu Beri is an entrepreneur.

Career
In 2000, Beri became head of the French fashion house, Jean Louis Scherrer, to design their pret-a-porter collections.

Ritu Beri was awarded the Chevalier des Arts et des Lettres (Knight of the Order of Arts and Letters) by the French government in 2010.

On 9 April 2016, Beri launched two books, The Designs of A Restless Mind and The Fire of A Restless Mind.

Honours

See also
 National Institute of Fashion Technology
 India Fashion Week

References

External links
Ritu Beri Official Website

Indian women fashion designers
Living people
Women artists from Delhi
Delhi University alumni
National Institute of Fashion Technology alumni
21st-century Indian designers
21st-century Indian women artists
1972 births
Businesswomen from Delhi
Businesspeople from Delhi
21st-century Indian businesswomen
21st-century Indian businesspeople
Fashion labels from India